The 2015–16 FK Austria Wien season was the 104th season in the club's history.

Background

Background information
Austria Wien received their licence on 30 April without any restrictions. Austria finished seventh in the 2014–15 Bundesliga and were the runner–up in the 2014–15 Austrian Cup. Gerald Baumgartner was sacked by Austria Wien during the 2014–15 season. Mirko Slomka rejected an offer from Austria Wien. Felix Magath eventually became the "preferred" choice. Magath opted not to sign with the club and Thorsten Fink became top candidate for the position. Fink was eventually hired on 28 May. He was given a two–year contract plus an option. Andreas Ogris became the assistant coach. It was later decided that Ogris would return to the reserve team. Austria had their first training under Thorsten Fink on 22 June.

Robert Almer, Olarenwaju Kayode, Ognjen Vukojević, Roi Kahat, and Richard Windbichler transferred to Austria Wien. Manuel Ortlechner became a reserve team player for Austria and also became an assistant coach for the under–14 team for the club. Kevin Friesenbichler was loaned to Austria with the option to purchase after a season. Heinz Lindner, Daniel Royer, Sascha Horvath, Markus Suttner and Martin Harrer left the club. Suttner had been at the club for 14 years.

Transfers

In

Out

Bundesliga

Bundesliga review

Matchdays 1–9
Austria started their Bundesliga campaign with a two–match winning streak. In the first match, on 26 July, Austria defeated Wolfsberg 2–0 with a goal from a penalty shot by Alexander Gorgon and a second half goal from Alexander Grünwald. Austria finished the matchday in second place. In the second match, on 2 August, Austria defeated Rheindorf Altach 3–1. Vanče Šikov, Olarenwaju Kayode, and Alexander Gorgon. Gorgon scored from the penalty mark for the second consecutive week. César Ortiz scored for Altach. Austria finished the matchday tied for first place with Rapid Wien. Then on matchday three, on 8 August, Austria dropped their first points of the season when Austria and Grödig finished in a 2–2 draw. Austria got a goal from Alexander Grünwald and an own goal from Harald Pichler and Grödig got a goal from Benjamin Sulimani and a goal from the penalty mark from Lucas Henrique. Lukas Rotpuller was sent–off during the match. Austria finished the matchday in second place. Austria picked up their first loss on 12 August (matchday four) in the Wiener Derby. Rapid Wien won 5–2. Alexander Gorgon scored two goals for Austria and Stefan Stangl, Philipp Schobesberger, Stefan Schwab, Steffen Hofmann, and Robert Berić scored for Rapid. Austria finished the matchday in fourth place.

League table

Results summary

Bundesliga fixtures and results

Austrian Cup

Austrian Cup review
In the opening match of the season, on 17 July, Austria won 3–0 with goals from Alexander Grünwald, Alexander Gorgon, and Philipp Zulechner.

Austrian Cup Fixtures and results

Friendly matches

Friendly fixtures and results

Player information

Squad and statistics

|}

References

FK Austria Wien seasons
Austria Wien